The Honda R engine is an inline-four engine launched in 2006 for the Honda Civic (non-Si). It is fuel injected, has an aluminum-alloy cylinder block and cylinder head, is a SOHC 16-valve design (four valves per cylinder) and utilizes Honda's i-VTEC system. The R series engine has a compression ratio of 10.5:1, features a "drive by wire" throttle system which is computer controlled to reduce pumping losses and create a smooth torque curve.

The engine uses many advanced technologies to improve fuel economy and reduce friction. Piston rings are given an ion plating and weight is reduced with plastic and aluminum parts and variable length intake manifolds that maintain ram air at a wide RPM range. The engine also features piston cooling jets, previously available only on high performance engines, and in the ninth-generation 1.8L Civic (2012-2015) the pistons are treated with molybdenum disulfide applied in a polka-dot pattern. The automatic transmission model is rated at California Air Resources Board (CARB) ULEV-2 (Ultra Low Emissions Vehicle) with fuel economy  city, and  highway. It also uses the same computer (engine control unit) controlled distributorless coil-on-plug ignition as the Honda K-series engines. As of September 2019, the R series engines were only offered outside of Japan.

R16

R16A
 Found in:
2006 Honda Civic (Singapore, Egypt, Turkey Market – FA1/FD series)
2012 Honda Civic (Singapore, Egypt, Turkey Market – FB series)
 Displacement: 
 SOHC iVTEC (Chain driven cam)
 Compression: 10.5:1
 Bore & stroke: 
 Power:  at 6,500 rpm
 Torque:  at 4,300 rpm
 Transmission: 5-speed
 Redline: 6800 rpm

R16B
 Found in:
2016 Honda Civic (Singapore, Egypt, Turkey, Cyprus, South Africa, Ukraine and Brunei – FC series)
 Displacement: 
 SOHC iVTEC (Chain driven cam)
 Compression: 10.7:1
 Bore & stroke: 
 Power:  at 6,500 rpm
 Torque:  at 4,300 rpm
 Transmission: CVT-7
 Redline: 6700 rpm

R18

R18A1
 Found in:
2006–2012 Honda Civic (South Africa/Thailand/Malaysia/Indonesia/Philippines/Taiwan/Japan/Indian-market FD1, Brazil, American/Canadian-market FA1 & FG1)
 2007–2009 Honda FR-V (European-market BE1)
 2008-2015 Honda City
 2007-2014 Honda Stream
 Displacement: 
 SOHC iVTEC (Chain driven cam)
 Compression: 10.5:1
 Bore & stroke: 
 Power:  at 6300 rpm (Japanese Spec)
 Torque:  at 4,300 rpm
 Fuel Cut Off: 6900 rpm
 Redline: 6800 rpm

R18A2
 Found in:
 2006–2011 Honda Civic (European-market FN1 & FK2)
 Displacement: 
 Compression: 10.5:1
 Bore & stroke: 
 Power:  at 6,300 rpm
 Torque:  at 4,300 rpm
 cruising/economy happens during VTEC under cruising load only.
 Redline: 6800 rpm
 Fuel Cutoff : 7150 rpm

R18Z1

 Found in:
2012–2015 Honda Civic (FB2, FG3)
2016–2020 Honda Civic (FC6, FK5)
 Displacement: 
 SOHC iVTEC (Chain driven cam)
 Compression: 10.6:1 (performance benefits from higher octane fuel)
 Bore & stroke: 
 Power:  at 6,500 rpm
 Torque:  at 4,300 rpm
 Redline: 6800
 Fuel cut off: 7100
 Single valve mode at low RPMs
 iVTEC engages economy cam profile from 1000 rpm to 3500 rpm, under light engine load. Engine runs on power cam profile by default.

R18Z4
 Found in:
 2012-2016 – Honda Civic (European-market FK2)
 Displacement: 
 Compression: 10.6:1
 Bore & stroke: 
 Power:  at 6,500 rpm
 Torque:  at 4,300 rpm
 Redline: 6800 rpm
 Fuel cut off : 7100 rpm
 cruising/economy happens during VTEC under cruising load only.
 Balancer Shaft on this R18.

R18Z6 

 Found in:
 2013-2017 – Honda Jade
 Displacement: 
 SOHC iVTEC (Chain driven cam)
 Compression: 10.6:1
 Bore & stroke: 
 Power:  at 6,500 rpm
 Torque:  at 4,300 rpm

R18Z9
 Found in:
 2016 – Honda HR-V
 Displacement: 
 Compression: 10.6:1
 Bore & stroke: 
 Power:  at 6,500 rpm
 Torque:  at 4,300 rpm

R18ZF
 Found in:
 2014 – Honda HR-V (Thailand)
 Displacement: 
 Compression: 10.6:1
 Bore & stroke: 
 Power:  at 6,500 rpm
 Torque:  at 4,300 rpm

R20

R20A1

 Found in:
 2007–2011 Honda CR-V (RE1, RE2)
 2008 – Honda Stream (RSZ)
 2013-2015 Acura ILX (DE1)
 Displacement: 
 Compression: 10.5:1
 Bore & stroke: 
 Power:  at 6,200 rpm
 Torque:  at 4,200 rpm
 Redline: 6800 rpm
 Fuel cut off: 7100 rpm
 SOHC run by timing chain
 iVTEC engages economy cam profile from 1000 rpm to 3500 rpm, under light engine load. Engine runs on power cam profile by default

R20A2
 Found in:
 2007–2011  Honda CR-V (RE5)
 Displacement: 
 Compression: 10.5:1
 Bore & stroke: 
 Power:  at 6,200 rpm
 Torque:  at 4,200 rpm

R20A3
 Found in:
 2008–2012 Honda Accord (CP1) (156 hp)
 2008–2015 Honda Accord (CU1/CN1/CW1) (156 hp)
 2013–2020 Proton Perdana (CP3) (156 hp)
 Displacement: 
 Compression: 10.5:1
 Bore & stroke: 
 Power:  at 6,300 rpm
 Torque:  at 4,300 rpm

R20A5
 Found in:
 2012–2015 Honda Civic (Southeast Asian FB3)
 Displacement: 
 Compression: 10.6:1
 Bore & stroke: 
 Power:  at 6,500 rpm
 Torque:  at 4,300 rpm

R20A6
 Found in:
 2012-2016 – Honda CR-V (RM1, RM2)
 Displacement: 
 Compression: 10.6:1
 Bore & stroke: 
 Power:  at 6,500 rpm
 Torque:  at 4,300 rpm

R20A9
 Found in:
 2012-2016 – Honda CR-V (RE6)
 Displacement: 
 Compression: 10.6:1
 Bore & stroke: 
 Power:  at 6,500 rpm
 Torque:  at 4,300 rpm

R20Z1
 Found in:
 2012–2015 Honda Civic (FB3)
 Displacement: 
 Compression: 10.6:1
 Bore & stroke: 
 Power:  at 6,500 rpm
 Torque:  at 4,300 rpm

R20Z2/R20Z3
 Found in:
 2013–2017 Honda Accord (CR1)
 Displacement: 
 Compression: 10.6:1
 Bore & stroke: 
 Power:  at 6,500 rpm
 Torque:  a

LF (R20-based hybrid engine)

LFA1 (i-VTEC + Sport Hybrid “i-MMD” (Intelligent Multi Mode Drive))
DOHC 16 valve 

Honda Odyssey Hybrid/e:HEV (Japan, RC4)
Honda Stepwgn Hybrid/e:HEV (Japan, RP5)

LFB1 (i-VTEC + Sport Hybrid “i-MMD” Intelligent Multi Mode Drive)
DOHC 16 valve 
Displacement: 
Bore x Stroke: 
Power (Engine):  / 6,200 rpm
Torque (Engine):  / 3,500 rpm
Power (Motor):  / 5,000-6,000 rpm
Torque (Motor):  / 0–2,000 rpm
Power (Combined):  / 6,200 rpm
Honda Accord Hybrid (Thailand, CV3)
Honda Odyssey e:HEV Absolute (International, RC4)

LFB-13 (i-VTEC + Sport Hybrid “i-MMD” Intelligent Multi Mode Drive e:PHEV)
DOHC 16 valve 
Displacement: 
Bore x Stroke: 
Power (Engine):  / 6,200 rpm
Torque (Engine):  / 3,500 rpm
Power (Motor):  / 5,000-6,000 rpm
Torque (Motor):  / 0–2,000 rpm
Power (Combined):  / 6,200 rpm
Honda CR-V Sport Hybrid e+ (China)

LFB-H4 (i-VTEC + Sport Hybrid “i-MMD” Intelligent Multi Mode Drive)
DOHC 16 valve 
Displacement: 
Bore x Stroke: 
Power (Engine):  / 6,200 rpm
Torque (Engine):  / 3,500 rpm
Power (Motor):  / 5,000–6,000 rpm
Torque (Motor):  / 0–2,000 rpm
Power (Combined):  / 6,200 rpm
Honda Accord Hybrid (Japan, CV3)
Honda CR-V Hybrid (Japan, RT5–RT6)
Honda Odyssey Hybrid/e:HEV (Japan, RC4)

LFC-H4
DOHC 16 valve 
Displacement: 
Bore x Stroke: 
Power (Engine):  / 6,000 rpm
Torque (Engine):  / 4,500 rpm
Power (Motor):  / 5,000–6,000 rpm
Torque (Motor):  / 0–2,000 rpm
Honda Civic e:HEV (Japan/Europe, FL4/Thailand, FE4)

See also
 Honda Engines

References

External links
 Honda Worldwide, Honda Develops New 1.8l i-VTEC Engine
 Honda Worldwide, New 1.8l i-VTEC Engine (Video)
 Discussion and testing of higher octane fuel with Honda R18 engine

R
2006 introductions
Straight-four engines
Gasoline engines by model